Babichev is a Russian masculine surname, its feminine counterpart is Babicheva. It may refer to

Maxim Babichev (born 1986), Belarusian handball player 
Mikhail Babichev (born 1995), Belarusian professional footballer
Roman Babichev (born 1975), Russian football player
Vladislav Babichev (born 1981), Russian volleyball player

Russian-language surnames